Kuniów  is a village in the administrative district of Gmina Kluczbork, within Kluczbork County, Opole Voivodeship, in southern Poland.

The name of the village is of Polish origin and comes from the word koń, which means "horse".

References

Villages in Kluczbork County